The drab myzomela or Seram myzomela (Myzomela blasii) is a species of bird in the family Meliphagidae. It is endemic to the islands of Seram, Boano and Ambon in Indonesia. Its natural habitats are subtropical or tropical moist lowland forests and subtropical or tropical moist montane forests.

References

drab myzomela
Birds of Seram
drab myzomela
Taxonomy articles created by Polbot